Tobago Express was a scheduled passenger  airline based in Trinidad and Tobago.  It operated as a sister airline of BWIA West Indies Airways and operated between the Arthur Napoleon Raymond Robinson International Airport (formerly Crown Point Airport) located in Tobago and Piarco International Airport located in Trinidad.

History 

Tobago Express was established in 2001. It was owned by BWIA West Indies Airways, now Caribbean Airlines (45%) and private investors (55%). As of October 1, 2007, Tobago Express was owned (100%) by Caribbean Airlines. In September 2007, Caribbean Airlines acquired all the outstanding shares in Tobago Express and began operational management of the airbridge under its code from 1 October 2007.

Destinations

Fleet 

The Tobago Express fleet included the following aircraft (at September 2007):

References

External links

Airlines established in 2001
Airlines disestablished in 2007
BWIA West Indies Airways
Caribbean Airlines
Defunct airlines of Trinidad and Tobago